Gymnocalycium quehlianum, the Quehla chin cactus, is a species of flowering plant in the family Cactaceae, native to northern Argentina.

In cultivation, where temperatures fall below  it requires the protection of glass.

This plant has gained the Royal Horticultural Society's Award of Garden Merit.

Gallery

References

quehlianum
Cacti of South America
Endemic flora of Argentina